Greg Pilewicz (November 29, 1951 – June 16, 2012) was an American politician. He served as a Democratic member for the 41st district of the Georgia House of Representatives.

Life and career 
Pilewicz was born in San Francisco, California, the son of Verma Louise and Peter George Pilewicz. He attended Oxford College of Emory University, Emory University and Georgia State University.

In 1977, Pilewicz was elected to represent the 41st district of the Georgia House of Representatives. He served until 1983, when he was succeeded by Charlie Watts.

Pilewicz died in June 2012, at the age of 60.

References 

1951 births
2012 deaths
Politicians from San Francisco
Democratic Party members of the Georgia House of Representatives
20th-century American politicians